XHMRL-FM is a radio station in Morelia, Michoacán. Broadcasting on 91.5 FM, XHMRL is owned by Grupo MarMor and carries a pop format known as 91.5 FM.

History
The station's concession was awarded in 1975 and has remained in the Martínez family.

The station has previously had similar formats under other names; at one point, the station was known as Max FM, and for a time XHMRL was the local outlet of Exa FM. The Top FM name was instituted on April 28, 2014. Since March 2018 it is identified only as "91.5 FM" with an adult contemporary format.

References

Radio stations in Michoacán